Tismana Hydro Power Plant is a large power plant on the Motru River situated in Romania.

The project was started in 1979 and finished in 1982 and it was made up by the construction of an arched concrete dam 48 m high which was equipped with two vertical turbines, the hydropower plant having an installed capacity of 106 MW.

The power plant generates 262 GWh of electricity per year.

See also

Porţile de Fier I
Porţile de Fier II

References

External links
Description 

Hydroelectric power stations in Romania
Dams in Romania
Dams completed in 1982
1982 establishments in Romania